Delicatessen is a 1930 German romance film directed by Géza von Bolváry and starring Harry Liedtke, Georgia Lind, and Ernő Verebes. It was shot at the Tempelhof Studios in Berlin. The film's sets were designed by the art director Robert Neppach.

Plot 
Franz Hellmer is the manager of Paul Wallis' delicatessen, and his friend Bela works there as a clerk. When the friends meet Lilo Martens, both are very taken with the pretty young woman. It quickly turns out, however, that Bela cannot score with Lilo, while the charming Franz thinks he has a chance. After partying with friends at the "Green Cockatoo" and cheering the performance of the singer Dolly Reves, and closing the place because of the police hour, the friends decide to continue the fun get-together in the deli. However, it is so loud that local residents alerted the police about disturbance of the peace. As a result, Franz and Bela lose their jobs.

However, the friends quickly find a new job with Mr. Markow, whose delicatessen is across the street. Markov expects something from this, since Franz is particularly popular with female customers because of his charming nature. Wallis, in turn, finds a new employee in Lilo. In fact, Markow was right with his decision, because the friends ensure that the delicatessen grows into serious competition for the Valais delicatessen within a short time. However, this competition for customers means losses for both businesses in the long run, so that the owners ultimately follow Franz's suggestion and combine their businesses. And that leads to another lucky circumstance for Franz, because he finally gets his Lilo.

Cast
Harry Liedtke as Franz Hellmer
Georgia Lind as Dolly Reeves
Ernő Verebes
Gustl Gstettenbaur as Lehrling
Hans Junkermann as Paul Wallis
 as J. E. Markow
Danièle Parola as Lilo Martens
Paul Hörbiger as Josef, Wallis's servant
Willy Prager as lecturer
Jo-Hai Tong as cabaret performer
Antonie Jaeckel as cashier

References

External links

1930s romance films
German romance films
Films of the Weimar Republic
Films directed by Géza von Bolváry
Films shot at Tempelhof Studios
Transitional sound films
German black-and-white films
1930s German films